The 2010 J.League Division 1 season was the 46th season of the top-flight club football in Japan and the 18th season since the establishment of J1 League. The season began on March 6 and ended on December 4.

A total of eighteen clubs participated in double round-robin format.  At the end of the season, top three clubs received automatic qualification to the following years' AFC Champions League.  Also the bottom three clubs were relegated to J2 League by default.

Nagoya Grampus won their first Japanese championship. This was also the first time since the advent of the J.League that the top scorer scored less than 20 goals; the honour of scoring 17 goals was shared between Nagoya's Joshua Kennedy and Júbilo Iwata's Ryoichi Maeda. Additionally, this was also the first Japanese top division season in which clubs from the Kantō region did not place among the top three.

Clubs

The following eighteen clubs will play in J.League Division 1 during the 2010 season. Of these clubs, Vegalta Sendai, Cerezo Osaka and Shonan Bellmare are the newly promoted clubs.  For the first time since 1995 season all top-flight teams are located on a single island (Honshū).

Format
Eighteen clubs will play in double round-robin (home and away) format, a total of 34 games each. A club receives 3 points for a win, 1 point for a tie, and 0 points for a loss. The clubs are ranked by points, and tie breakers are, in the following order:
 Goal differential
 Goals scored
 Head-to-head results
 Disciplinary points
A draw would be conducted, if necessary.  However, if two clubs are tied at the first place, both clubs will be declared as the champions. The bottom three clubs will be relegated to J.League Division 2.  The top three clubs will qualify to AFC Champions League in the following year.
Changes from previous year
 Regular season schedule had two months break after May 16 games, due to 2010 FIFA World Cup. Season was resumed from July 17, with exceptions for clubs advancing to the Round of 16 of 2010 AFC Champions League, which 11th-week matches were rescheduled to July 14.

League table

Results

Top scorers

Awards

MVP 
 Seigo Narazaki

Best XI

Attendance

References

J1 League seasons
1
Japan
Japan